

This is a  list of bodies of water by salinity that is limited to natural bodies of water that have a stable salinity above 0.05%, at or below which water is considered fresh.

Water salinity often varies by location and season, particularly with hypersaline lakes in arid areas, so the salinity figures in the table below should be interpreted as an approximate indicator.

See also
List of brackish bodies of water

References

Notes

Bibliography
 

Salinity
Oceans
Saline water